Playfair Football Annual is a compact football annual. It is a reference book primarily covering football in England, Scotland and Europe.
It was first published in 1948. It was last published in 2012/13.

See also
 Playfair Cricket Annual (a similar reference work for cricket, first produced in 1948)

References

Association football books
Sports reference works